Frank James Coyle (November 2, 1886 – February 20, 1947) was an American track and field athlete who competed in the 1912 Summer Olympics. He was born in Chicago, Illinois. In 1912 he finished eighth in the pole vault event.

References

External links

1886 births
1947 deaths
Track and field athletes from Chicago
American male pole vaulters
Olympic track and field athletes of the United States
Athletes (track and field) at the 1912 Summer Olympics